Nedenes is a village in Arendal municipality in Agder county, Norway. The village is located in the southern part of Arendal, just north of the municipal border with Grimstad. The Norwegian County Road 420 runs through the village heading north to the village of Rød and onwards to the island of Hisøya to the north. Engene Church is located in Nedenes.

The county of Agder was named Nedenes amt from the 1600s until 1919. This name was chosen because the Nedenes village was once a large, medieval farm and later was the seat of the county officials.

References

Villages in Agder
Arendal